This is a list of Madagascar and Indian Ocean Island animals extinct in the Holocene that covers extinctions from the Holocene epoch, a geologic epoch that began about 11,650 years before present (about 9700 BCE) and continues to the present day.

The Republic of Madagascar is a large island country in the Indian Ocean, off the coast of East Africa. Other Indian Ocean islands near Madagascar include the Mascarene Islands (split between the Republic of Mauritius and the French department of Réunion), the Republic of Seychelles, and the Comoro Islands (split between the Union of Comoros and the French department of Mayotte).

Madagascar and the Indian Ocean islands are a biodiversity hotspot. The wildlife of Madagascar evolved in isolation and is distinct from the wildlife of Africa and other continents. Approximately 90 percent of all plant and animal species found in Madagascar are endemic. Lemurs are endemic to the island of Madagascar.

Numerous animal species have disappeared from Madagascar and the Indian Ocean islands as part of the ongoing Holocene extinction, driven by human activity. The famous dodo (Raphus cucullatus), last seen in 1662, was endemic to Mauritius. All 17 extinct lemurs were giant lemurs larger than the extant lemurs.

The subfossil remains of certain avian orders are scarce on Réunion. Consequently, a few of the extinct birds from Réunion are hypothetical species. They almost certainly existed but lack supporting subfossil remains.

Locally extinct native species are included below, but human-introduced species that were later wiped out are not included.

Mammals (class Mammalia)

Afrosoricidans (order Afrosoricida)

Tenrecs (family Tenrecidae)

Incertae familiae

Primates (order Primates)

Aye-ayes (family Daubentoniidae)

Koala lemurs (family Megaladapidae)

Lemurids (family Lemuridae)

Monkey lemurs (family Archaeolemuridae)

Sloth lemurs (family Palaeopropithecidae)

Rodents (order Rodentia)

Nesomyids (family Nesomyidae)

Bats (order Chiroptera)

Megabats (family Pteropodidae)

Family Rhinonycteridae

Family Hipposideridae

Carnivorans (order Carnivora)

Malagasy carnivorans (family Eupleridae)

Even-toed ungulates (order Artiodactyla)

Hippopotamids (family Hippopotamidae)

Birds (class Aves)

Elephant birds (order Aepyornithiformes)

Elephant birds (family Aepyornithidae)

Waterfowl (order Anseriformes)

Ducks, geese, and swans (family Anatidae)

Flamingos (order Phoenicopteriformes)

Flamingos (family Phoenicopteridae)

Locally extinct

Grebes (order Podicipediformes)

Grebes (family Podicipedidae)

Pigeons and doves (order Columbiformes)

Pigeons and doves (family Columbidae)

Cuckoos (order Cuculiformes)

Cuckoos (family Cuculidae)

Rails and cranes (order Gruiformes)

Rails (family Rallidae)

Albatrosses and petrels (order Procellariiformes)

Petrels and shearwaters (family Procellariidae)

Locally extinct

Boobies, cormorants, and relatives (order Suliformes)

Sulids (family Sulidae)

Locally extinct

Cormorants and shags (family Phalacrocoracidae)

Locally extinct

Pelicans, herons, and ibises (order Pelecaniformes)

Ibises and spoonbills (family Threskiornithidae)

Herons (family Ardeidae)

Locally extinct, herons (family Ardeidae)

Pelicans (family Pelecanidae)

Locally extinct

Hawks and relatives (order Accipitriformes)

Hawks, eagles, kites, harriers and Old World vultures (family Accipitridae)

Locally extinct, hawks, eagles, kites, harriers and Old World vultures (family Accipitridae)

Owls (order Strigiformes)

True owls (family Strigidae)

Kingfishers and relatives (order Coraciiformes)

Ground rollers (family Brachypteraciidae)

Falcons (order Falconiformes)

Falcons and caracaras (family Falconidae)

Parrots (order Psittaciformes)

Old World parrots (family Psittaculidae)

Locally extinct, old World parrots (family Psittaculidae)

Passerines (order Passeriformes)

Reed warblers (family Acrocephalidae)

Bulbuls (family Pycnonotidae)

White-eyes (family Zosteropidae)

Starlings (family Sturnidae)

Weavers (family Ploceidae)

Reptiles (class Reptilia)

Squamates (order Squamata)

Common geckos (family Gekkonidae)

Skinks (family Scincidae)

Splitjaw snakes (family Bolyeriidae)

Typical blind snakes (family Typhlopidae)

Turtles (order Testudines)

Tortoises (family Testudinidae)

Crocodilians (order Crocodilia)

Crocodiles (family Crocodylidae)

Ray-finned fish (class Actinopterygii)

Cichlids and convict blennies (order Cichliformes)

Cichlids (family Cichlidae)

Toothcarps (order Cyprinodontiformes)

Livebearers and relatives (family Poeciliidae)

Insects (class Insecta)

Butterflies and moths (order Lepidoptera)

Brush-footed butterflies (family Nymphalidae)

Copepods (class Copepoda)

Order Calanoida

Family Diaptomidae

Order Cyclopoida

Family Cyclopidae

Gastropods (class Gastropoda)

Order Stylommatophora

Family Cerastidae

Family Euconulidae

Family Helicarionidae

Family Streptaxidae

Order Architaenioglossa

Family Cyclophoridae

Order Littorinimorpha

Family Pomatiidae

Bivalves (class Bivalvia)

Order Unionida

Family Unionidae

See also 
 List of African animals extinct in the Holocene
 List of European animals extinct in the Holocene

Notes

References

Madagascar
†Holocene